The Pekin Celestials were an Illinois–Missouri League baseball team based in Pekin, Illinois, USA that played from 1909 to 1913.

In their very first season, the Celestials had four different managers. Two future major league baseball players played for them that year as well: Cecil Coombs and Mike Prendergast. Coombs played for them in 1910 as well. In 1911 and 1912, future big leaguers Jim Bluejacket and Patsy McGaffigan played for the Celestials. 1913 is the only year in which no known future big league players played for the Celestials.

References

Baseball teams established in 1909
1909 establishments in Illinois
Sports clubs disestablished in 1913
1913 disestablishments in Illinois
Defunct baseball teams in Illinois
Defunct minor league baseball teams
Celestials
Illinois-Missouri League teams
Baseball teams disestablished in 1913